Veinteañera, divorciada y fantástica is a 2020 Mexican comedy film directed by Noé Santillán-López. The film is produced by All About Media, and stars Paulina Goto, and Vadhir Derbez. It's a spin-off of the 2016 film titled Treintona, soltera y fantástica. The film premiered on 13 March 2020, and during the COVID-19 pandemic it remained in the first place of the national box office, breaking a record for a Mexican film and according to Imcine's 2020 Statistical Yearbook, it was the most streamed Mexican film of the year.

Cast 
 Paulina Goto as Regina
 Vadhir Derbez as Juanpa
 Jesús Zavala as Andrés
 Natalia Téllez as Tábata
 Ela Velden as Lorenza
 Giselle Kuri as Roberta
 Juan Carlos Barreto as Manuel
 Claudio Roca as Santi
Paco Rueda as Turrón
Eduardo Arroyuelo Nicolás
Ricardo Peralta "Torpecillo" as Toñito
Ana González Bello as Emiliana
Carlos "Capi" Pérez as Cholo
Manelyk as herself

References

External links 
 

Mexican comedy films
2020s Spanish-language films
2020 films
2020 comedy films